Madame Vera (or Verra) von Blumenthal together with Rose Dugan (or Dougan) contributed to the development of the Pueblo Indian pottery industry by teaching the potters of the local pueblos techniques which made the pottery more attractive to collectors. They lived at Duchess Castle, north of Santa Fe, New Mexico around 1918 during the summer and in Pasadena, California during the winter.  The archeologist Edgar Lee Hewett may have contributed to this effort.

See also 
 Santa Fe and the United States

References

External links
 Santa Fe, Sappho, Cecily and Northern Exposure
 Tsankawi Trail Guide
 Women Artists of the American West

Educators from New Mexico
American women educators
History of New Mexico